Luke Matthew Daniels (born 5 January 1988) is an English professional footballer who plays for  club Middlesbrough as a goalkeeper.

Daniels is product of the Manchester United and West Bromwich Albion academies and played much of the early years of his career away on loan from the latter club. He transferred to League One club Scunthorpe United in 2015 and served as first-choice goalkeeper until 2017, when he transferred to Championship club Brentford and held a backup role until transferring to Middlesbrough in 2021. Daniels won three caps for England at U18 and U19 level.

Club career

West Bromwich Albion

2004–2008 
A goalkeeper, Daniels began his career in the academy at Manchester United, before moving to the academy at West Bromwich Albion in 2004. Upon completing his scholarship, he signed his first professional contract with the club in July 2006. The departure of second-choice goalkeeper Russell Hoult in January 2007 led to Daniels being temporarily promoted onto the substitutes' bench for the majority of the remaining matches of the 2006–07 season. Though he failed to make an appearance, he signed a new two-year contract at the end of the season.

2007–2010 
Following a loan away at Scottish Premier League club Motherwell during the second half of the 2007–08 season, Daniels spent the entire 2008–09 and 2009–10 seasons away on loan at League Two and League One clubs Shrewsbury Town and Tranmere Rovers respectively. He made more than 40 appearances for both clubs and reached the 2008 League Two play-off Final with Shrewsbury Town, which was lost 3–2 to Stockport County. Daniels signed a two-year contract extension with West Bromwich Albion in July 2009.

2010–2013 
Daniels spent much of the 2010–11 season away on loan at League One clubs Bristol Rovers (two spells), Charlton Athletic and Rochdale. Daniels was called into a West Bromwich Albion matchday squad for the first time in nearly four years for two League Cup matches early in the 2011–12 season, but remained an unused substitute in both. His final loan away from The Hawthorns began in October 2011, when he spent the remainder of 2011 with League Two club Southend United. During the second half of the 2011–12 season, he became regular backup to Márton Fülöp. Daniels backed up Boaz Myhill during the first half of the 2012–13 season, but failed to feature during the second half of the campaign. He signed a new two-year contract in March 2013.

2013–14 
Daniels received his first call up of the 2013–14 season onto the bench for a Premier League match versus Everton and he made his long-awaited Baggies debut as a 77th-minute substitute for the injured Ben Foster and helped the team to a 0–0 draw. He made his first start for the club in the following game, keeping another clean sheet in a 3–0 League Cup second round victory over Newport County. He also started in the following round against Arsenal and helped to keep the score at 1–1 before the Gunners sealed victory on penalties. The injury to Ben Foster allowed Daniels to continue as second-choice goalkeeper behind Boaz Myhill until 14 December 2013, when he received his final first team call up of the 2013–14 season.

2014–15 
Daniels was called up for two Premier League matches in October and November 2014, but remained an unused substitute on both occasions. In the final year of his contract, he left the club on 22 January 2015, having made just three first team appearances during  years as a professional at The Hawthorns. Over the course of his loans away from the club, Daniels made 114 appearances.

Scunthorpe United
On 22 January 2015, Daniels signed a -year contract with League One club Scunthorpe United for an undisclosed fee. The Iron were without first and second-choice goalkeepers Sam Slocombe and James Severn due to broken arms. Daniels made 23 appearances in what remained of the 2014–15 season. He made 44 and 42 appearances during the 2015–16 and the 2016–17 seasons respectively and kept more clean sheets than any other goalkeeper in League One during that period, with 27 in 78 matches. Daniels departed the club in May 2017, after his contract expired. He made 109 appearances during his -year spell at Glanford Park.

Brentford
On 24 May 2017, Daniels joined Championship club Brentford on a free transfer and signed a three-year contract, with an option for a further year, effective 1 July 2017. Daniels appeared in each of the club's four cup matches during the 2017–18 season and made his league debut versus Hull City on the final day, in which he helped preserve a 1–1 draw by saving a second-half penalty. Aside from cup appearances and two league starts, Daniels was again backup to Daniel Bentley for the majority of the 2018–19 season. A season-ending shoulder injury suffered by Bentley in March 2019 allowed Daniels a run in the team in league matches and he finished the season with 19 appearances in all competitions.

Daniels served as backup to new goalkeeper signing David Raya during the 2019–20 season. It was announced on 4 January 2020 that Daniels has signed a one-year contract extension, with the option of a further year. Later that day, he captained an under-strength XI to a 1–0 FA Cup third round victory over Stoke City. Daniels finished the 2019–20 season with three cup appearances and did not feature during Brentford's unsuccessful playoff campaign.

With David Raya unavailable, Daniels started six of Brentford's first seven matches of the 2020–21 season. Despite reverting to his backup role behind Raya in October 2020, Daniels continued to play in cup matches and his performance in a 1–0 EFL Cup quarter-final victory over Newcastle United on 22 December was recognised with a place in the EFL Cup Team of the Round. Daniels' performances in his three appearances during Brentford's run to the semi-finals of the EFL Cup saw him named in the Team of the Tournament. He finished the 2020–21 season with nine appearances and a promotion medal, by virtue of being an unused substitute during the 2021 Championship play-off Final. Daniels finished his four-season Brentford career with 36 appearances and departed the Community Stadium in June 2021.

Middlesbrough 
On 9 August 2021, Daniels signed a two-year contract with Championship club Middlesbrough on a free transfer. He made 12 appearances during a 2021–22 season in which the club narrowly missed out on a play-off finish. With the 2022 off-season signings of Zack Steffen and Liam Roberts, Daniels dropped down to third-choice goalkeeper for the 2022–23 season.

International career
Daniels made his international debut with a start in a 2–1 victory for England U18 over Slovenia in April 2006. He won two caps for the England U19 team in September and October 2006 in matches versus the Netherlands U19 and Austria U19.

Personal life
Daniels' boyhood club was Bolton Wanderers.

Career statistics

Honours
Brentford
EFL Championship play-offs: 2021

Individual
EFL Cup Team of the Tournament: 2020–21

References

External links
Luke Daniels at mfc.co.uk
Luke Daniels at premierleague.com

1988 births
Living people
Footballers from Bolton
English footballers
Association football goalkeepers
Manchester United F.C. players
West Bromwich Albion F.C. players
Motherwell F.C. players
Shrewsbury Town F.C. players
Tranmere Rovers F.C. players
Charlton Athletic F.C. players
Rochdale A.F.C. players
Bristol Rovers F.C. players
Southend United F.C. players
Scunthorpe United F.C. players
English Football League players
Scottish Premier League players
Premier League players
Middlesbrough F.C. players